Stephen Low may refer to:

 Stephen Low (diplomat) (1927–2010), American diplomat
 Stephen Low (filmmaker) (born 1950), Canadian film director and screenwriter

See also
 Stephen Lowe (disambiguation)